= Randall Morck =

Canadian economist

- Born: 1956 (age 69–70)

Academic background
- Education: BSc, applied mathematics and economics, MA, 1979, Yale University; PhD, economics, 1986, Harvard University
- Thesis: Essays on capital structure (1986)

Academic work
- Institutions: University of Alberta
- Website: randallmorck.ca

Randall Karl Morck (born 1956) is a Canadian economist. He holds the Stephen A. Jarislowsky Distinguished Chair in Finance and a Distinguished University Professorship at the University of Alberta's Alberta School of Business.

== Early life and education ==
Morck was born in 1956. Morck graduated summa cum laude in applied mathematics and economics from Yale in 1979, and earned his PhD from Harvard University in 1986.

== Career ==
Upon completing his PhD, Morck joined the faculty at the University of Alberta in July 1986 as an assistant professor. In 1992, Morck was granted the Stephen A. Jarislowsky Distinguished Chair in Finance. and received the University of Alberta's highest academic honour, a University Professorship. He also served as Visiting Professor of Economics at Harvard, Mackenzie-king Visiting Chair at Harvard, and Sloan Visiting Professor at Yale. In 2011, Morck received the Bank of Canada's 2011 Fellowship Award as his research "is highly relevant to the Bank’s work in monetary policy and financial stability."

Morck studies corporate governance, the functioning of financial markets and institutions, and world financial history. Morck edited History of Corporate Governance around the World published in 2005 by the National Bureau of Economic Research and the University of Chicago Press. Later, he helped the University of Alberta launch its master of financial management program in Shenzhen, China.
